Gardy Granass (born 7 January 1930) is a retired German actress. She appeared in around forty films and television series, after making her screen debut in Tromba (1949). In 1953 she appeared in  based on a Hans Schubert play.

Selected filmography
 Tromba (1949)
 A Heidelberg Romance (1951)
 A Very Big Child (1952)
 Red Roses, Red Lips, Red Wine (1953)
 My Leopold (1955)
 Three Girls from the Rhine (1955)
 The Happy Village (1955)
 The Model Husband (1956)
 Die Christel von der Post (1956)
 Black Forest Melody (1956)
 A Thousand Melodies (1956)
 Drei Mann auf einem Pferd (1957)
 The Big Chance (1957)
 Spring in Berlin (1957)
 When the Heath Is in Bloom (1960)
  (1962, TV miniseries)

References

External links

Bibliography 
 Goble, Alan. The Complete Index to Literary Sources in Film. Walter de Gruyter, 1999.

1930 births
Living people
German film actresses
German television actresses
Actresses from Berlin
20th-century German actresses